A metropolitan area or metro is a region consisting of a densely populated urban core and its less populated surrounding territories under the same administrative division, sharing industry, infrastructure and housing.
Based on these faculties Ahmedabad is the largest metropolitan area in Gujarat.

This is a list of metropolitan areas by population in Gujarat. The 74th Amendment to the Indian Constitution defines a metropolitan area as: An area having a population of 10 Lakh or 1 Million or more, comprised in one or more districts and consisting of two or more Municipalities or Panchayats or other contiguous areas, specified by the Governor by public notification to be a Metropolitan area.

List 
List is based on the concern cities data by Wikipedia.

See also 

 List of cities in Gujarat by population
 List of metropolitan areas in India
 List of million-plus urban agglomerations in India

References 

Gujarat
Cities
Cities and towns in Gujarat
Gujarat
Population